This is a list of Italian television related events from 1979.

Events

RAI 

 January 13: Mino Vergnaghi, with Amare, wins the Sanremo music festival, hosted by Mike Bongiorno and Anna Maria Rizzoli. Rai broadcasts integrally only the finally evening, that gets a rating of 22.3 million viewers.
 22 February. Announcement of the sentence in the Catanzaro trial, for the Piazza Fontana bombing. The hearings have been, for the first time, integrally shoot  by the RAI cameras. From 25 September, a selection in five episodes  of the proceedings is aired, showing to the public the embarrassed and reticent depositions of politicians, such as Giulio Andreotti and Mariano Rumor.
 26 April. The documentary Trial for rape, realized by a feminist collective, shocks the public opinion, showing  the victim of a ravishment humiliated and criminalized by the defense attorneys.
 3 December: the impersonator Alighiero Noschese, long time a star of Italian television, shots himself in the chapel of the Roman clinic where he was hospitalized; he suffered for years from depression, because the divorce and some professional fails.  
 15 December. The adolescent actress Fabiana Udenio announces the beginning of RETE 3 broadcasting. This is the schedule of the first day.

Rete 3 is, in the intents, focused on the local realities, with programs and news realized by the RAI regional offices; however, for years it will be a “ghost channel”, lacking of means and ignored by the public.

Private channels 
In 1979, the  Italian private televisions have a breakthrough: the most active buy massively films and American telefilms, hire RAI stars as Mike Bongiorno and Pippo Baudo and begin to broadcast in National scope (the rule forcing them to operate only locally is bypassed, airing on several local stations  the same show, prerecorded on videotape). Particularly  dynamic is the Silvio Berlusconi’s  Telemilano 58.

New televisions (with the date of the first airing) 

 4 March: TV Port, syndication of 90 local channels, specialized in  American film and telefilm.
 19 June: Antenna Sicilia, owned by the newspaper editor Mario Cancio Sanfilippo, art director Pippo Baudo
 July: Rete televisiva Italiana, owned by Il Messaggero's editor Carlo Perrone.
 2 July : Compagnia televisioni Associate; syndication of 20  local channels.
 Autunni : TV Parma
 8 September. GPE-Telemond, by Arnoldo Mondadori editore,  later fused with Rete televisiva Italiana in Rete 4.

The Berlusconi's ascent 

 30 January: Silvio Berlusconi founds Rete Italia, society for the marketing of TV shows. The newborn society gets right away a big deal, buoying 325 movies from Titanus for 2 billion liras.
 13 September : Birth of Publitalia, the Berlusconi's advertising media agency.
 December. Telemilano 58, till then visible only in Milan, extends its signal to the whole Lombardy.
 5 December. Mike Bongiorno debuts on Silvio Berlusconi's Telemilano 58 with the game show The dreams in the weaver; he's the first TV star who leaves RAI to work full-time for a private network. The collaboration between Bongiorno and the public company, lasted 27 years, has got into crisis few months before with an unsuccessful remake of Lascia o raddoppia?

Debuts

RAI 

 3,2,1... contatto – show for children, inspired by the homonymous PBS program; 2 season. It sees the debut of Paolo Bonolis.
 Fantastico (Fantastic) – show of the Saturday evening, aired in autumn and bound to the Lotteria Italia. In the Eighties, as Canzonissima in the Sixties, is the most viewed RAI show and causes also political controversies. The first edition, directed by Enzo Trapani and hosted by Beppe Grillo, Loretta Goggi and Heather Parisi, gets an audience of 23, 600 million viewers.
 Storia di un italiano (History of an Italian) – history of the modern Italy through an anthology of the Alberto Sordi’s movies – 4 seasons.
 TG3 settimanale (Weekly TG3) - magazine

Private channels 

 Ciao ciao (Hello hello) –cartoon show; started on the Mondadori's Telenord, it becomes later one of the most popular show for children of the Fininvest network, lasted for 32 seasons.
 I sogni nel cassetto (Dreams in the drawer) – game show, hosted by Mike Bongiorno (Telemilano 58) – 2 seasons.
 Telemattina (TV morning) – with Ettore Andenna, first European show aired in the morning (Antenna 3) – 2 seasons.
 Telemenù – cooking show, with Wilma De Angelis (Telemontecarlo) – 18 seasons.
 VG21 news (Canale 21)

Television shows

Drama 

 La promessa (The promise) – by Alberto Negrin, with Rossano Brazzi; from Friedrich Durrenmatt’s The pledge.
 Rocco Scotellaro – by Maurizio Scaparro, with Bruno Cirino; the true story of Rocco Scotellaro, poet, socialist militant and major of his village.
 Profumo di classe (Classy perfume)  - by Giorgio Capitani, with Ombretta Colli and Aldo Maccione; musical inspired by Pygmalion, but with inverted gender roles (here, it's a female teacher to educate a tramp).
 The tree of Wooden Clogs by Ermanno Olmi and Orchestra rehearsal by Federico Fellini (both previously distributed in the cinemas).

Miniseries 

 Cinema! – by Pupi Avati, with Lino Capolicchio, in 5 episodes; follow-up of Jazz Band, it fictionalizes the adventurous Avati's debut as movie director.
 Ma che cos’è questo amore? (This love, what is it?) – by Ugo Gregoretti, in 2 episodes, with Stefano Satta Flores and Roberto Benigni, from the Achille Campanile’s humoristic novel; the slap of a woman to an intrusive suitor has the most unpredictable and absurd consequences. 
Among the foreign productions, the hit of the year is the American Holocaust, with 20.2 million viewiers.

Period dramas 

 Accadde ad Ankara (It happened in Ankara) – by Mario Landi, in 3 episodes; reconstruction of the “Cicero affair” with Stefano Satta Flores as Elyesa Bazna.
Le affinità elettive (Elective affinities) – by Gianni Amico, from the Johan Wolfgang Goethe’s novel, with Franco Graziosi, Nino Castelnuovo and the future director Francesca Archibugi; 3 episodes.
 Bel Ami – by Sandro Bolchi, with Corrado Pani, in 4 episodes; from the Guy de Maupassant’s novel.
 Che fare? (What is to be done?) – by Gianni Serra, with Elisabetta Pozzi and Remo Girone, in 5 episodes; from the Nikolaj Gavrilovič Černyševskij’s novel.
 Il delitto Notarbatolo (The Notarbartolo affair) – by Alberto Negrin, in 3 episodes, with Ivo Garrani; reconstruction of the first clamorous Mafia crime, happened 1n 1893.
 La commediante veneziana (The venetian actress) – by Savatore Nocita, in 5 episodes, from the Raffaello Calzini's novel; the life of the actress Teodora Ricci, lover of Carlo Gozzi.
 I vecchi e I giovani (The old and the young ones) – by Marco Leto, with Gabriele Ferzetti and Alain Cuny, in 5 episodes; from the Luigi Pirandello’s novel. In the Sicilia of the late Nineteenth century, the “old generation” (the Risorgimento men, by now corrupted or disillusioned) face the “young people” (the socialists of the Fasci Siciliani).
 Martin Eden – by Giacomo Battiato, with Christopher Connelly, in 5 episodes, from the Jack London’s novel.

Mystery 

 Così per gioco (Just a game) – by Leonardo Cortese, in 5 episodes, with Mariano Rigillo; mystery set in the world of the gamble.
 Luigi Ganna detective – by Maurizio Ponzi, in 4 episodes, with Luigi Pistilli; the adventures of a Milan private eye.
 La vedova e il piedipiatti (The widow and the cop) – comic-mystery serial, by Mario Landi, in 6 episodes; with Ave Ninchi and Veronica Lario

Fantastic 

 Racconti di fantascienza (SF tales) – by Alessandro Blasetti (in the last direction of a fifty years career), in 3 episodes, with Arnoldo Foà as the teller.
 I racconti fantastici di Edgar Allan Poe (Edgar Allan Poe’s fantastic tales) – by Daniele D’Anza, in 4 episodes, with Philippe Leroy as Roderick Usher. The classical horror stories of the American writer are transferred in the USA of the Twentieth Century.

News and educational 

 Made in England - reportage about England, by Enzo Biagi, in 12 episodes. 
 Il cuore della Jugoslavia è fatto di mulini (Yugoslavia's heart is made by mills) - reportage by Tonino Guerra, in 3 episodes.
 Sono arrivati quattro fratelli (Four brothers are arrived) – documentary by Maricla Boggio about the child-adoption.

Variety 

 C’era una volta Roma (Once upon a time in Rome) – with the Bagaglino troupe; parodic history of the Italian capital.
 Carissimi, la nebbia agli irti colli (Dearest, the fog at the steep hills) – first variety aired on Rai 3.
 Due come noi (Two people like us) – by Antonello Falqui, with Pino Caruso and Ornella Vanoni.
 Grand’Italia– talk show, hosted by Maurizio Costanzo.
 Luna park – hosted by Pippo Baudo, with Tina Turner as constant guest; debut of Heather Parisi.
 Tilt – with Stefania Rotolo.
 Una valigia tutta blu (A fully blue bag) – musical show, hosted by Walter Chiari.

Private channels 

 Il Napoleone – game show, with Ettore Andenna, directed by Cino Tortorella (Antenna 3 Lombardia)
 Ottava nota – music show, with Richard Benson (TVA 40).

Ending this year 

 L’altra domenica
 Gioco città.
 Montecarlo sera
 Non Stop
 La sberla.

Births
 3 January: Francesco Bellissimo, celebrity chef

Deaths 

 3 November: Paolo Carlini, 57, actor, star of the early Italian television.
 5 November: Amedeo Nazzari, 72, actor, star of the black-and white Italian cinema, in the Sixties active in television as player in fiction and TV-dramas.
 3 December: Alighiero Noschese, 47, impersonator (see over)

References 

1979 in Italian television